Scarlet's Hidden Treasures is an extended play by Tori Amos. Packaged with Amos' live video Welcome to Sunny Florida, the release collects six outtakes from the sessions for Scarlet's Walk. Many of the tracks included also appeared on a web project entitled "Scarlet's Web" that was accessible to those who bought a copy of the album.

The track "Apollo's Frock" was partially conceived in 1996 during a live performance of "Doughnut Song" from the Boys for Pele era. "Bug a Martini" is a bossa nova–influenced piece featuring prominent use of a Wurlitzer electric piano.

"Mountain", a song featured on "Scarlet's Web", was not released as part of this collection, and still remains unreleased outside of that project.

Track listing

Personnel
Tori Amos – Bösendorfer piano, Fender Rhodes piano, Wurlitzer electric piano, vocals
Mac Aladdin –  acoustic guitar
Matt Chamberlain – drums
Jon Evans –  bass guitar

References

External links

2004 EPs
Tori Amos EPs
Epic Records EPs